Peton may refer to:
 Piton, a metal spike to aid climbing
 A 5-face in a polytope
 Howard le Peton (1895–1981), Welsh-born Irish cricketer